"(Shake, Shake, Shake) Shake Your Booty" is a song recorded and released in 1976 by KC and the Sunshine Band for the album Part 3. The song became their third number-one hit on the Billboard Hot 100, as well as their third number-one on the Hot Soul Singles chart. The song was met with a degree of controversy, since the lyrics were interpreted or likely speculated by many as having sexual connotations. According to KC, it had a lot more meaning and depth. During his performance he would witness the entire crowd having a good time except for some minority. The song inspired people to "get off their can and get out there and do it". The B-side of "Shake Your Booty" is "Boogie Shoes", which later became a hit on its own after it appeared on the Saturday Night Fever soundtrack in 1977 and then having its own release as a single in early 1978, becoming a top 40 hit in several countries including the UK and US.

The chorus consists of the title expression with shake appearing eight times.

Record World said that "A hypnotic invitation to get on the dance floor and shake, shake, shake your booty is one that you just can't pass up!"

Chart performance

Weekly charts

Year-end charts

All-time charts

Certifications

See also

List of Billboard Hot 100 number-one singles of 1976
List of Cash Box Top 100 number-one singles of 1976
List of number-one R&B singles of 1976 (U.S.)
List of number-one singles of 1976 (Canada)

References

External links

1976 songs
1976 singles
Billboard Hot 100 number-one singles
Cashbox number-one singles
KC and the Sunshine Band songs
RPM Top Singles number-one singles
Songs about dancing
Songs written by Harry Wayne Casey
Songs written by Richard Finch (musician)
TK Records singles